Knowable Magazine is a non-profit, editorially independent online publication from science publisher Annual Reviews that discusses scientific discoveries and the significance of scholarly work in a journalistic style.  The magazine uses information from Annual Reviews' 51 review journals as springboards for stories on topics such as health & disease, society, geography, environment and other science-related material, linking back to scholarly sources. As a nonprofit publication, Knowable Magazine is supported by grants from the Gordon and Betty Moore Foundation and the Alfred P. Sloan Foundation.

History 
Launched in October 2017,  Knowable Magazine was Folio magazine'''s 2018 Ozzie Award Winner for "Design, New Magazine" in the category "Consumer / Custom"
and an Honoree for the 2020 Webby Awards. It was a winner or honorable mention in multiple categories of the Folio Eddie and Ozzie Awards for 2018, 2019, and 2020. Awards that Knowable Magazine has received for its articles also include the 2020 Jonathan Eberhart Planetary Sciences Journalism Award for distinguished popular writing from the American Astronomical Society (2020), Best Shortform Science Writing awards (2020, 2019, 2018), and Best Online Articles & Essays from Entropy Magazine (2018).  Knowable is published in both English and Spanish.

 Availability Knowable Magazine is available to read online without a subscription or other fees. The articles in the magazine are published under a CC BY-ND copyright license prohibiting derivative works. Major national and international publications including The Atlantic, PBS NewsHour, Scientific American, Smithsonian, Discover, the BBC, and The Washington Post have republished articles from Knowable Magazine.''

References 

 

Weekly magazines published in the United States
2017 establishments in the United States
Online magazines published in the United States
Popular science magazines
Annual Reviews (publisher) academic journals